Henry Andries Shembeni is a South African politician. He was elected to the National Assembly in 2019 as a member of the Economic Freedom Fighters.

Since becoming an MP, Shembeni has served on the Portfolio Committee on Police.

References

External links
Mr Henry Andries Shembeni at Parliament of South Africa

Living people
Year of birth missing (living people)
Place of birth missing (living people)
Economic Freedom Fighters politicians
Members of the National Assembly of South Africa
Women members of the National Assembly of South Africa